Ballet Imperial was name initially given to the ballet Tschaikovsky Piano Concerto No. 2 (ballet)

It may also refer to
 Tchaikovsky's Piano Concerto No. 2
 Mariinsky Ballet, formerly known as the Imperial Russian Ballet
 More generally, a style of ballet in Russia